Lee Hyo-jae (November 4, 1924October 4, 2020) was a South Korean social activist who advocated for women's rights. She is noted for pioneering gender studies and campaigning for gender equality in South Korea.

Biography 
Lee was born in Masan, South Gyeongsang Province, Korea, later part of independent South Korea. Her father, Lee Yak-shin, was a church minister and her mother, Lee Oak-kyung, was a social worker whose career included running an orphanage.

Lee completed her bachelor's degree in Alabama, and earned a master's degree in sociology from Columbia University. On her return to South Korea following her studies, she helped found the department of sociology at Ewha Womans University in 1958. She also established the first course at the university on women's studies in 1977, which grew to become South Korea's first graduate program in women's studies.

Campaigns advocated by Lee included the reexamination of patriarchal customs in South Korea, including male denomination of heads of households, as well as discrimination against women in property inheritance. She was also noted for her advocacy for quotas for female employment as well as actions towards wage equality for men and women. Her actions led to the abolishment of the country's patriarchal naming system, allowing for people to use both parents' surnames. She also helped establish a rule that required half of the candidates for South Korea's National Assembly to be women.

Her campaigns also led to a demand for Japan to pay monetary compensation to comfort women, who were sexual slaves for Japanese armed forces during the Japanese occupation of Korea.

Lee died on October 4, 2020 from sepsis, in Changwon, South Korea, aged 95.

References 

2020 deaths
1924 births
Academic staff of Ewha Womans University
South Korean women activists
South Korean women academics
People from South Gyeongsang Province
Deaths from sepsis
Infectious disease deaths in South Korea